The United States Administrator of Drug Enforcement is the head of the Drug Enforcement Administration, a United States federal law enforcement agency under the United States Department of Justice, tasked with combating drug trafficking and distribution within the United States. The current administrator is Anne Milgram.

The administrator is appointed by the president of the United States and confirmed by the U.S. Senate. The administrator reports to the Attorney General through the Deputy Attorney General. The administrator is assisted by a deputy administrator, the chief of operations, the chief inspector, and three assistant administrators (for the Operations Support, Intelligence, and Human Resources divisions). Other senior staff include the chief financial officer and the chief counsel. The administrator and deputy administrator are the only presidentially appointed personnel in the DEA; all other DEA officials are career government employees.

List of administrators
Unnumbered rows denote acting commissioners.

References